The AORN Journal is a peer-reviewed nursing journal in the field of perioperative nursing and is the official journal of the Association of periOperative Registered Nurses (AORN).

Abstracting and indexing 
The journal is covered by the following abstracting and indexing services:  CINAHL,  Index Medicus/MEDLINE, the Hospital Literature Index, the International Nursing Index, and RNdex Top 100.

External links 
 
 Association of periOperative Registered Nurses

Perioperative nursing journals
English-language journals
Monthly journals
Wiley-Blackwell academic journals
Publications established in 1963
Academic journals associated with learned and professional societies